Xenopirostris is a genus of birds in the family Vangidae. They are all endemic to Madagascar.

Species
It contains the following species:

 
Bird genera
 
Taxa named by Charles Lucien Bonaparte
Taxonomy articles created by Polbot